John Stanley Webb (11 January 1920 – 22 January 2002) was an English transport historian.

Born in Walsall, Staffordshire, Webb developed an interest in trains as a child; he traveled by rail to school. He wrote many books on British  and other countries trams and tramway systems, while working for his family's firm, James Webb and Sons, of Bloxwich, which he joined in 1935 and from which he retired as Managing Director in 1986.

Midland Metro named an AnsaldoBreda T-69 tram in his honour in a ceremony at Birmingham Snow Hill station on 17 July 2004.

Bibliography

References

External links 
 Tram 10 at TheTrams.co.uk - includes picture of nameplate

1920 births
2002 deaths
Railway historians
20th-century English historians
People from Walsall